The Croatian World Games are an Olympics-style competition pitting autochthonous Croat communities in Croatia and neighbouring nations against each other and Croatian diaspora communities. The event is organized by the Croatian Olympic Committee and the Croatian World Congress.

The first and the second Games were held in Zadar in 2006 and 2010, and the third Games were held in Zagreb in 2014. In the 2010 Games, there were 2,500 participants from 24 countries, competing in 12 events.

Sports in the Croatian World Games
 Archery
 Badminton
 Basketball
 Beach Volleyball
 Boxing
 Cycling
 Equestrian
 Football
 Gymnastics
 Handball
 Judo
 Shooting
 Swimming
 Taekwondo
 Tennis
 Volleyball
 Weightlifting
 Wrestling

2006 results

References

External links
Home page

Croatian diaspora
Recurring events established in 2006
Sport in Croatia